Santa Casa de Misericordia Hospital is a major Hospital based in Porto Alegre, Brazil. It is reference in Latin America for transplants and genetic research.

It is a university hospital linked to the Federal University of Health Sciences of Porto Alegre.

See also
 Universities and Higher Education in Brazil

External links

Buildings and structures in Porto Alegre
Teaching hospitals in Brazil